Sako Dam is a gravity dam located in Ehime Prefecture in Japan. The dam is used for irrigation. The catchment area of the dam is 4.1 km2. The dam impounds about 11  ha of land when full and can store 1110 thousand cubic meters of water. The construction of the dam was started on 1989 and completed in 2001.

References

Dams in Ehime Prefecture
2001 establishments in Japan